Nebet was a vizier during the late Old Kingdom of Egypt by Pharaoh Pepi I of the Sixth dynasty.

Nebet may also refer to:
 Nebet (queen), Egyptian Queen, the wife of King Unas
 Nebet-Het, a goddess in ancient Egyptian religion
 Nebet Tepe, a hill of Plovdiv